Stawell Airport  is located  southwest of Stawell, Victoria, Australia on Grampians Road.

See also
 List of airports in Victoria

References

Airports in Victoria (Australia)
Stawell, Victoria